Peak Wilderness sanctuary is a natural reserve in Sri Lanka.  It is the third largest (by area) of the 50 sanctuaries in the country.

"Sri Pada" Peak Wilderness sanctuary is a tropical rain forest that spreads over a land of 224 square kilometers around the Sri Pada (Adam's Peak) mountain. A huge forest area that belonged to the Peak Wilderness was cut down and cleared during the British colonial rule in Sri Lanka (1815-1948) to gain land for the massive tea estates which are still functioning in Nuwara Eliya district. The remaining portion of the Peak Wilderness was declared a wildlife sanctuary on October 25, 1940.

The contours of "Sri Pada" Peak Wilderness vary from 1000 to 7360 feet above sea level. Therefore, it possesses unusual geographical formations compared to the other natural reserves of the island. Bena Samanala (6579 ft), Dotalugala, Detanagala, are some of the taller mountains in the Peak Wilderness. It is also the birthplace of Kelani, Kalu, Walave rivers and many tributaries of the river Mahaweli which make waterfalls such as Dotalu falls, Geradi falls, Galagama falls (655 ft), and Mapanana falls (330 ft) inside the sanctuary.

Out of the 3 access routes; Hatton route, Kuruwita route and Palabaddala route, which Buddhist devotees and other tourists use to reach the Adam’s Peak, Kuruwita and Palabaddala routes go right across the Peak Wilderness sanctuary. This forest area is entirely under the control of Sri Lanka Wildlife Conservation Department. It does not maintain any lodge, bungalow or such type of facility for tourists inside Peak Wilderness sanctuary in order to safeguard the purity of this forest. Yet, there is no restriction for eco-tourists to enter the sanctuary after obtaining permission from Sri Lanka Wildlife Conservation Department. Entering the sanctuary during the rain season is at the tourist’s own risk because of the unforeseen downpours and instant floods lead to life-risk situations.

Location
It is located within the Sabaragamuwa mountain range in the central hills.

Boundaries
There are no specific boundaries for the Peak Wilderness sanctuary. Most boundaries are marked by plantations owned by the Government and the private sector. The eastern boundary is clear and connected to Pidurutalagala mountain region and Horton Plains National Park.

Fauna
In October 2009, the world's rarest toad Adenomus kandianus was rediscovered in this sanctuary after it was thought to be extinct for 133 years.

See also
Protected areas of Sri Lanka

References

Protected areas in Central Province, Sri Lanka
Protected areas in Sabaragamuwa Province
Wildlife sanctuaries of Sri Lanka
1940 establishments in Ceylon
Protected areas established in 1940